The Halland-class destroyers were two ships built for the Swedish Navy in the 1950s. Four ships were planned, but the second pair were canceled. Two modified ships were exported to the Colombian Navy. These vessels were general purpose surface combatants.

Design
These were general purpose ships with strong anti-submarine and anti-surface warfare armament. They were re-fitted in the 1960s and re-armed with Saab Robot 08 anti-shipping missiles (a missile derivative of the Nord Aviation CT20 drone). The Colombian ships had a more anti-surface focused armament.

Ships

Swedish Navy
 , built by Götaverken, Gothenburg. Commissioned 1955. Decommissioned 1982, scrapped 1985.
 , built by Eriksberg, Gothenburg. Commissioned 1956. Decommissioned 1979, now a museum ship in Gothenburg.
 HSwMS Lappland, cancelled 1958.
 HSwMS Värmland, cancelled 1958.

Colombian Navy
  (ex-Trece de Junio) (D 06), built by Götaverken, Gothenburg. Commissioned 1958. Decommissioned 1986, scrapped.
 , built by Eriksberg, Gothenburg. Commissioned 1958. Decommissioned 1986, scrapped.

References

External links

 
Destroyers of the Swedish Navy
Destroyer classes